Shuko Aoyama and Xu Yifan were the defending champions, having won the event in 2012, but Xu chose not to defend her title. Aoyama partnered up with Misaki Doi as the third seeds, but were knocked out of the tournament in the quarterfinals.

Thai duo Nicha Lertpitaksinchai and Peangtarn Plipuech won the tournament defeating the first seeds, Julia Glushko and Chanel Simmonds in the final, 7–6(7–5), 6–3

Seeds

Draw

References 
 Draw

Fifth Third Bank Tennis Championships - Women's Doubles
2013 WD